Jai Lamar Lewis (born February 13, 1983) is an American former basketball player who last played for Sabios de-Manizales in Colombia. He now works as a behavioral specialist in Parkville, Maryland.

College career

He grew up in Germany to US Army serving parents and began to play basketball while there at the age of 6. When he turned 8 his family moved to Aberdeen, Maryland, where he played for the local Aberdeen High School. He is best known for his career in college basketball at George Mason University. A power forward, Lewis was the primary inside force for the Patriots during their "Cinderella" run to the 2006 Final Four. Lewis was selected as the 47th pick overall in the 2006 CBA Draft by the Pittsburgh Xplosion.

NFL attempt
Lewis was signed as an undrafted free agent by the New York Giants of the National Football League following the 2006 NFL Draft wanting to pursue a career similar to Antonio Gates and Marcus Pollard.

He ended his pursuit of an NFL career as an offensive tackle to pursue his basketball options. Although he was listed at Mason as 6'7", 275 lb (2.01 m, 125 kg), the Giants listed him at 6'5", 292 lb (1.96 m, 133 kg).

Professional career

Weeks after leaving the Giants, Lewis signed with KK Bosna for $8,000 a month. Lewis was expected to play a significant role for the defending champions. However, Lewis was released from his contract in just six weeks. The team felt he was too small to play power forward in the Adriatic League.

Shortly after leaving Bosna, Lewis signed to play in Israel for Ironi Ramat Gan. The contract was for "more than $5,000 a month". In twenty-seven games, he averaged 15.4 points, 5.5 rebounds, and 1.7 steals.

Following his rookie season in Israel, Jai Lewis signed with Strasbourg IG, a French team. Just four games into the season, with Lewis averaging only 3 points on 27% shooting, Strasbourg released Lewis.

After playing for Strasbourg, Jai Lewis signed with Hapoel Galil Elyon, another Israeli team who took part in the ULEB Cup, to finish the 2008 season. He finished the season averaging 12.6 points, 4.2 rebounds, and 1.7 steals in league play. Next, Lewis played for the Rain or Shine Elasto Painters in the Philippine Basketball Association along with former George Mason University teammate Fil-Am guard Gabe Norwood.

Prior to the 2010-11 season, he returned to Ironi Ramat Gan from Israel, and played in Liga Leumit for 4 games in 2010. He then moved to Japan to play top basketball. In 2013, after playing in Colombia he retired from professional basketball.

See also
George Mason Patriots men's basketball
2005-06 George Mason Patriots men's basketball season
2004-05 George Mason Patriots men's basketball team

External links
George Mason Patriots bio
Post-collegiate career summary

References 

1983 births
Living people
African-American basketball players
American expatriate basketball people in Bosnia and Herzegovina
American expatriate basketball people in Colombia
American expatriate basketball people in France
American expatriate basketball people in Israel
American expatriate basketball people in Japan
American expatriate basketball people in the Philippines
American expatriate basketball people in South Korea
American men's basketball players
Basketball players from Maryland
Changwon LG Sakers players
George Mason Patriots men's basketball players
Hapoel Galil Elyon players
Ironi Ramat Gan players
Israeli Basketball Premier League players
KK Bosna Royal players
Levanga Hokkaido players
People from Aberdeen, Maryland
Philippine Basketball Association All-Stars
Philippine Basketball Association imports
Power forwards (basketball)
Rain or Shine Elasto Painters players
SIG Basket players
Sportspeople from the Baltimore metropolitan area
Sun Rockers Shibuya players
21st-century African-American sportspeople
20th-century African-American people